Trilogija (trans. "Trilogy") is a compilation album from influential Serbian and former Yugoslav rock band Riblja Čorba. The album features all songs from three parts of Riblja Čorba trilogy, Trilogija 1: Nevinost bez zaštite, Trilogija 2: Devičanska ostrva and Trilogija 3: Ambasadori loše volje.

Track listing

Personnel
Bora Đorđević - vocals
Vidoja Božinović - guitar
Vicko Milatović - drums
Miša Aleksić - bass guitar
Nikola Zorić - keyboards

2007 compilation albums
Riblja Čorba compilation albums